Spurius Carvilius Ruga (fl. 230 BC) was the freedman of Spurius Carvilius Maximus Ruga. He is often credited with inventing the Latin letter G. His invention would have been quickly adopted in the Roman Republic, because the letter C was, at the time, confusingly used both for the /k/ and /g/ sounds. For example, Ruga's own name contained this confusion: SPVRIVS CARVILIVS RVCA (At that time, "U" and "V" were also the same letter). In the latter half of the 3rd century B.C., Ruga is the first man in recorded history to have been attested as opening a private elementary school, although other such schools may have existed in Rome prior to his.

Plutarch is the main source for these inventions, and Quintus Terentius Scaurus confirms the former in De Orthographia. The letter G was already in use before 230 BC; Wilhelm Paul Corssen theorized in Über Aussprache that what Plutarch really meant was that Ruga's elementary school was the first place to assign the C and G to their current phonemes of /k/ and /g/.

See also
Carvilia (gens)

References

Sources
Quaestiones Romanae questions 54 and 59.
Earliest Roman Divorces: Divergent Memories or Hidden Agendas? by Gary Martin
 The Origin of the Latin Letters G and Z by George Hempl

Ruga, Spurius
3rd-century BC Romans
Republican era slaves and freedmen